Sonal Ambani is an Indian sculptor and author. She is known for her 2004 book Mothers and Daughters, a photographic journal celebrating the mother-daughter relationship, which she wrote after losing her mother to cancer as a way of honoring her. Ambani mentored her children as they completed a sequel to Mothers and Daughters called Fathers and Sons,  which was released in 2009. Her sculptures have featured in many prominent exhibitions, most notable and recent of which is her sculpture Riderless World which is being shown at the Venice 2022 Art Biennale, organized by the European Cultural Centre. She has a patent for Systems and Method for providing Financial Services to Children and Teenagers. She grew up in New York City. Her father's art gallery in New York had a significant influence on her. She played the double bass in an orchestra and a jazz ensemble. Her father taught her how to sculpt. She was a skilled equestrian show jumper.

In 2010 she was named as the head of FICCI's ladies organization, FLO, in Ahmedabad.

Notable artistic achievements 
Ambani began sculpting across various mediums and styles. Her work is part of the collections of many Indian art collectors and with collectors from Europe, the Middle East and the USA. Her works have been showcased at the Venice Art Biennale, India Art Fair, The Bahrain Art Fair, Ahmedabad Art Fair and several art festivals and at galleries in India. In 2018, she was selected to be among 101 people to create a piece for the Elephant Parade in India. Her stainless steel sculpture "The March of Time"  was chosen to be showcased and auctioned in Mayfair, London for the Concours d’éléphant Auction. A number of her  sculptures are  a part of the collection of the Royal Family of Bahrain. Her sculptures have also been exhibited at the Habitat Centre and Jehangir Art Gallery after being selected by the Art Society of India. Her stainless steel elephant "Elegance in Steel", which was exhibited at the India Art Fair in 2015, found a home in Switzerland. A vineyard in Nashik has been named The Red Tree Vineyard after her towering 25 feet tall, majestic sculpture, "Tree of Serenity".

Awards and recognition 

 The Times of India Women Power Award for Art and Sculpture(2019)
 The Women of Excellence Award from FICCI-FLO(2018)
 Pfeffer Peace Award(2011)
 Pride of Gujarat-Maharashtra Award(2011)
 Tej Gyan Foundation(2011)

References

Living people
Year of birth missing (living people)
Indian women photographers
21st-century Indian non-fiction writers
Women writers from Gujarat
Photographers from Gujarat
21st-century Indian women writers
21st-century Indian writers